IAWA may refer to:

International Archive of Women in Architecture
International Association of Wood Anatomists
Italian Artisan Web Agency